Ralph Winter may refer to:

Ralph Winter (producer) (born 1952), American movie producer
Ralph K. Winter Jr. (1935–2020), American judge
Ralph D. Winter (1924–2009), American missionary leader

See also 
Ralph E. Winters (1909–2004), Canadian film editor